Admiral Sir Frederic William Fisher KCVO (5 October 1851 – 23 December 1943) was a Royal Navy officer who became President of the Royal Naval College, Greenwich.

Naval career
Born the son of Captain William Fisher and the younger brother of John Fisher, Fisher joined the Royal Navy around 1870. He was given command of the cruiser HMS Grafton in 1898 and the battleship HMS Collingwood in 1899. In early February 1900 it was announced that Fisher would be appointed in command of the battleship HMS Illustrious, but the appointment was cancelled, and he remained in charge of Collingwood for another couple of months. On 18 April 1901, he commissioned at Chatham the pre-dreadnought battleship HMS Revenge, which was to serve both as coast guard ship at Portland and flagship of Rear-Admiral Sir Gerard Noel, Admiral Superintendent of Naval Reserves. He received command of the battleship HMS Canopus in 1904. He went on to be Admiral Superintendent of Malta Dockyard in 1907 and President of the Royal Naval College, Greenwich in 1911 before retiring in 1914.

References

|-

1851 births
1943 deaths
Royal Navy admirals
Knights Commander of the Royal Victorian Order
Admiral presidents of the Royal Naval College, Greenwich
People educated at King Edward VI School, Lichfield